

Geography

110th Street is a major east–west street in Manhattan, New York City.

110th Street may also refer to the following subway stations on the aforementioned street:

Cathedral Parkway–110th Street (IRT Broadway–Seventh Avenue Line), serving the  train
Cathedral Parkway–110th Street (IND Eighth Avenue Line), serving the  trains
Central Park North–110th Street (IRT Lenox Avenue Line), serving the  trains
110th Street (IRT Lexington Avenue Line), serving the  trains
110th Street (IRT Ninth Avenue Line), former station

Music

Songs

"Across 110th Street" by Bobby Womack and Peace from the film soundtrack for the 1972 crime drama film Across 110th Street.